Kitchen gods are mythical beings that represent abstract concepts such as luck or just propel the minor changes of everyday life.  Little things that cannot be explained, such as losing small objects like socks in the laundry, are often attributed to these creatures because the explanation eludes the believer.

See also 
List of deities
Household deity
 Jowangsin is a Korean kitchen god.
 Zàojūn is a Chinese kitchen god.
 Kōjin is a Japanese kitchen god.
 Ông Táo is a Vietnamese kitchen god.

References

European mythology